Carl David Watson (born January 6, 1941) was a former a professional American football player who played offensive lineman for two seasons for the Boston Patriots.

Biography
Watson is considered one of the best athletes in the history of Eufaula High School where he starred for the Tigers in football and basketball (1954-1958). He played under legendary Eufaula High coaches A. W. "Bill" Buchanan in football (the Tigers record was 27-9 during Watson's playing career at Eufaula) and basketball under Jack Powell where he played on a district championship team during his senior year.  Watson was a two time All-State selection in high school, as a two-way lineman, and was a three time All-SEC performer at Georgia Tech (1959-1963). He was chosen AP lineman of the week in 1961 for his outstanding play against Duke University. In the game, he recorded 12 individual tackles, numerous assists, and a fumble recovery while playing on both sides of the ball. Watson was chosen Most Valuable Lineman in the 1962-1963 Hula Bowl college all-star game and is a member of the All Time Gator Bowl team.

In 1962, Watson played in one of Georgia Tech's biggest wins in their storied football history. The Bobby Dodd coached Jackets upset Bear Bryant's Alabama Crimson Tide, in Atlanta, on November 14 of that year. The Tide was ranked #1 in the country and led by All-America quarterback Joe Namath. The 7-6 Jackets' victory gave Alabama its only loss of the year and ended the Tide's quest for a second straight national championship in what many Tech fans consider the greatest game ever played at Historic Grant Field.

He went on to play professional football with the Boston Patriots in the old American Football League (1963-1964) and the Edmonton Eskimos of the Canadian Football League (1965). He is a member of the Wiregrass Sports Hall of Fame (the Wiregrass is a region in southeast Alabama, southwest Georgia, and northwest Florida; it is also known as the peanut growing capital of the world).
After his playing career ended he returned to Georgia Tech and earned a master's degree in Electrical Engineering. Dave had three children, Lynne, Neal, and Amy. He retired and lived near Pine Mountain, Georgia until his death in 2021.

Notes

References

1941 births
American football offensive linemen
Boston Patriots players
Georgia Tech Yellow Jackets football players
People from Eufaula, Alabama
Players of American football from Alabama
American Football League players